The Combined Defence Services Examination (abbreviated as CDS Exam)  is conducted by the Union Public Service Commission for recruitment of Commissioned Officers in the Indian Military Academy, Officers Training Academy, Indian Naval Academy and Indian Air Force Academy. The Notification for the examination is usually released in the months of December and May, and the examinations are conducted in April and September respectively. Only unmarried graduates are eligible to sit for the exam. Examination is conducted twice a year. Successful candidates are admitted into the respective Academies after an interview conducted by the Services Selection Board (SSB).

Age Limit

Educational Qualifications 
CDS Exam Educational Qualifications is given below.

Physical Standards 
Candidates must be physically fit according to physical standards criteria given in the official advertisement by the UPSC.

Union Public Service Commission has set the eligibility criteria For Combined Defence Services. Before applying to the CDS exam Candidate must check the eligibility criteria.
The basic physical standard for a candidate is:
 The candidate should be physically as well as mentally fit.
 Permanent tattoos on the body are prohibited.
 No hernia anywhere on the body. 
 No hearing impairment, deformities/disabilities in-ears vestibule-cochlear system.
 There is no active congenital venereal disease.
Here are the requirements for the Height and Weight standards to qualify for CDS exam:

Scheme of Examination

CDS Exam Pattern 

Union Public Service Commission will release the admit card of CDS 2/2021 any time soon in online mode at upsconline.nic.in. Since the exam is slated to be conducted on November 14, 2021 in offline mode. After downloading CDS 2/2021 admit card candidates should check for any discrepancy and if found then immediately report it to the exam conducting authorities to get it rectified.

Indian Military Academy / Air Force Academy / Naval Academy
All the papers are of objective type.

Officers' Training Academy
Each paper contains objective type questions.

Intelligence and Personality Test 
The SSB interview process consists of a two-stage Selection process – stage I and stage II. Only those candidates who successfully clear the stage I SSB interview are permitted to appear for stage II.

(a) Stage I comprises Officer Intelligence Rating (OIR) tests are Picture Perception* Description Test (PP&DT). The candidates will be shortlisted based on the combination of performance in the OIR Test and PP&DT.

(b) Stage II Comprises Interview, Group Testing Officer Tasks, Psychology Tests, and the Conference. These tests are conducted over 4 days. The details of these tests are given on the Indian Army career portal.

The personality of a candidate is assessed by three different assessors viz. The Interviewing Officer (IO), Group Testing Officer (GTO), and the Psychologist. There is no separate weightage for each test. The marks are allotted by assessors only after taking into consideration the performance of the candidate holistically in all the tests.

Test/ Interview by Air Force Selection Board 
All candidates who apply for the Air Force through more than one source will be tested/interviewed at the Air Force Selection Boards only once for Air Force. Common candidates who fail in Computer Pilot Selection System (CPSS) and/ or Pilot Aptitude Battery tests as an NCC or Airmen candidate will be called again for OLQ testing for Army/Navy/OTA only if it is found that they have applied through CDS Exam.

CDS I 2020 Vacancy

CDS II 2020 Vacancy 
CDS 2 2020 Total number of vacancies are given below.

CDS I 2021 Vacancy 
CDS 1 2021 Total number of vacancies are given below.

See also

 List of Public service commissions in India

References 

Union Public Service Commission
Standardised tests in India
Military education and training in India
Year of establishment missing